Joanne Morgan (born 7 October 1983) is a British volleyball player. She competed for Great Britain at the 2012 Summer Olympics.

References

British women's volleyball players
Volleyball players at the 2012 Summer Olympics
Olympic volleyball players of Great Britain
1983 births
Living people
Setters (volleyball)